The Elymaic alphabet is a right-to-left, non-joining abjad.
It is derived from the Aramaic alphabet.
Elymaic was used in the ancient state of Elymais, which was a semi-independent state of the 2nd century BCE to the early 3rd century CE, frequently a vassal under Parthian control, in the present-day region of Khuzestan, Iran (Susiana).

Unicode

The Elymaic alphabet was added to the Unicode Standard in March, 2019 with the release of version 12.0.

The Unicode block for Elymaic is U+10FE0–U+10FFF:

References

Abjad writing systems
Obsolete writing systems
Elymais